Gaz-e Gharbi (also Romanized as Gaz-e Gharbī; also known as Gaz) is a village in Anzan-e Gharbi Rural District, in the Central District of Bandar-e Gaz County, Golestan Province, Iran. At the 2006 census, its population was 2,317, in 604 families.

References 

Populated places in Bandar-e Gaz County